Yvon Madiot (born 21 June 1962) is a French former racing cyclist. He won the French national road race title in 1986, going on to finish tenth in that year's Tour de France.

He is the younger brother of fellow retired racing cyclist and double winner of Paris–Roubaix, Marc Madiot, and works alongside Marc as part of the management of the  cycling team as an assistant sports director. He has played a particularly important role in developing young riders, mentoring Arthur Vichot, Jérémy Roy, Cédric Pineau, Mathieu Ladagnous, Mickaël Delage, Arnaud Démare and William Bonnet, among others.

Major results

Road

1983
 1st Stage 10 Course de la Paix
 1st Stage 5 Tour de Normandie
 5th Overall Tour de l'Avenir
1984
 1st Grand Prix de Cannes
1985
 2nd Chanteloup-les-Vignes
 3rd Grand Prix de Plumelec
 5th La Flèche Wallonne
 5th Overall Settimana Internazionale di Coppi e Bartali
 9th Paris–Camembert
1986 
 1st  Road race, National Road Championships
 7th Bordeaux–Paris
 7th Grand Prix de Cannes
 8th Overall Paris–Nice
 9th Tour of Flanders
 10th Overall Tour de France
1987
 2nd Boucles Parisiennes
 4th Liège–Bastogne–Liège
 4th Overall Tour Midi-Pyrénées
 5th La Flèche Wallonne
 6th Grand Prix de Wallonie
 7th Gent–Wevelgem
 8th Overall Vuelta a España
 8th Overall Tour du Haut Var
1988
 4th Overall Grand Prix du Midi Libre
 5th Grand Prix des Amériques
 7th La Flèche Wallonne
 9th Overall Critérium du Dauphiné Libéré
1989
 2nd Grand Prix des Amériques
 5th Giro dell'Emilia
 9th Overall Grand Prix du Midi Libre
 9th Kuurne–Brussels–Kuurne
1990
 3rd Giro dell'Emilia
 4th GP de Fourmies
 7th GP Ouest–France
1991
 1st Grand Prix de Cannes
1992
 9th Overall Four Days of Dunkirk

Grand Tour general classification results timeline

Cyclo-cross
1984
 1st  National Championships
1985
 1st  National Championships
1986
 1st Cyclo-cross du Mingant
 2nd National Championships
1987
 1st  National Championships
1988
 1st Cyclo-cross du Mingant
 3rd National Championships

References

External links
 

1962 births
Living people
French male cyclists
Sportspeople from Mayenne
Cyclists from Pays de la Loire